James Chapman Bishop (1783 – 2 December 1854) was a notable British organ manufacturer of the 19th century.

History
He was apprenticed to Benjamin Flight and then set up his own business in London in 1807 initially at York buildings in Marylebone and later at 250 Marylebone Road.

On his death in 1854, the business was run by his son, Charles Augustus Bishop (born 1821), John Starr and William Ebenezer Richardson, and was known as Bishop, Starr and Richardson from 1854 to 1857, and then Bishop and Starr from 1857 onwards. From 1873 it became Bishop and Son.

Works

All Saints' Church, Northallerton 1818
St Peter's Church, Dorchester 1823
St Mary Abchurch 1823
St John's Church, Waterloo 1824
St Mary Aldermanbury 1824
All Souls Church, Langham Place 1825
St Mark's Church, North Audley Street 1825
St Paul's Cathedral 1826
Holy Trinity Church, Marylebone 1828
 The Revd Dr Philip Wynter, President, St John's College, Oxford 1828
St James's Church, Bermondsey 1829
St Bartholomew's Church, Wednesbury 1830
St James' Church, Clapham 1832
St Edmund, King and Martyr 1833
Norwich Cathedral 1834
St Michael's Church, Coventry 1836
St Peter's Church, Eaton Square 1837
St Giles Church, Willenhall 1837
Port Antonio Church, Jamaica 1838
Shrewsbury Music Hall 1839
St James' Church, Devizes 1841
Catholic Chapel, Dalton Square, Lancaster 1841
Gravesend Literary Institution 1842
Church of St Barnabas, Queen Camel 1842
Roman Catholic Chapel, Stockton-on-Tees 1842
Savoy Chapel 1843
St Giles' Church, Camberwell 1844
St Martin's Church, Liskeard 1844
St Kentigern's Church, Crossthwaite, Cumbria 1844-45
Holy Trinity Church, Clapham 1845
St John's, Notting Hill 1846
Holy Trinity Church, Paddington 1846
St Martin's Church, Bowness-on-Windermere 1846
Brighton Town Hall 1847
Jesus College, Cambridge 1847
Catholic Chapel, Lowther Street, Carlisle 1848
Hereford Cathedral 1849
St Mark's Church, Pensnett 1849
St James's Church, Piccadilly 1852
St George's, Bloomsbury 1853

References

Burials at Kensal Green Cemetery
1783 births
1854 deaths
British pipe organ builders